Francis Woodbine Blackman (21 September 1922 – 6 July 2010) was a Caribbean author, former secretary of the University of the West Indies Cave Hill Campus, a member of the Dalkeith Methodist Church, and a retired consultant of the Canadian Training Aid Programme.

Biography

Early life
His parents, James T. Blackman and his mother Etta (née Wiltshire), lived at "Albany", Two Mile Hill in St. Michael.  He attended the Roebuck Moravian Boys' School and then Harrison College, which he left in 6B (sixth form) to go into teaching.

He first held appointments as science teacher at Boys' Foundation School, St. Vincent Grammar School and St. Kitts Grammar School. He was then appointed Principal of Montserrat Secondary School, and then returned to St. Kitts as Headmaster of the St. Kitts Grammar School.

His cousins, Marjorie, Luther and Errol Wiltshire, were as close as siblings. A very dear and precious part of his time then was eighteen years spent in St Kitts and Montserrat. He had been a local preacher since 1955 and was a Circuit Steward in the St. Kitts Methodist Church.

He married Cynthia Inniss.

The UWI years
He worked in the sugar industry in St Kitts until 1966. He then took the post of Secretary at College of Arts and Sciences of the University of the West Indies (UWI Cave Hill Campus, Barbados) in 1966, just three years after the establishment in Barbados of The College of Arts and Sciences at UWI and this was during the tenure of Principal Sir Sidney Martin. He worked in collaboration with resident tutors in the OECS territories to increase the flow of information on academic programmes from UWI to prospective students, arranged and facilitated visits of colleagues from the islands, gave public lectures, interviewed prospective candidates, and successfully sought to bring the university closer to its constituents.

Later years
Upon leaving the university, he spent time as director of the Barbados Advocate, and worked with Canadian International Development Agency (CIDA). He started writing articles and letters for and to the newspaper and proceeded to add to the records of the Methodist Church through his documentation of much of the activity in Barbados and other parts of the Caribbean Circuit. He seemed to have a particular attraction to a Barbados National Heroine to be, a member of the Methodist Church, Sarah Ann Gill. He wrote a biography of Dame Nita Barrow and when he started waning was occupied with the records of one of working Barbados' leaders, Clennell Wickham.

His funeral was held at the Bethel Methodist Church, and he is buried at the family plot in the churchyard of St. Barnabas Anglican church in St. Barnabas Road, St. Michael, Barbados.

Writer
Blackman is best known as a writer for his work in the religious history genre and more particularly Methodist religion in Barbados. He authored the books Dame Nita: Caribbean Woman, World Citizen and Methodism: 200 Years in Barbados and a booklet on national heroine Ann Gill, revered for her defence of Methodism in Barbados in the early 19th century.

Bibliography
Wickham, John, and Blackman, Francis, Punctuations in time: a collection of short stories and other essays (2004, 277 pp)
Blackman, Francis "Woodie", John Wesley 300: pioneers, preachers and practitioners (Barbados: Dalkeith Methodist Church, 2003, 89 pp)
Blackman, Francis, National heroine of Barbados: Sarah Ann Gill (Barbados: Methodist Church, 1998, 27 pp)
Blackman, Woodie, "Obituary: Dame Nita Barrow" (England: The Independent, 22 December 1995)
Blackman, Francis "Woodie", Dame Nita: Caribbean Woman, World Citizen (Kingston, Jamaica: Ian Randle Publishers, 1995, 224 pp)
Blackman, Francis, Methodism: 200 Years in British Virgin Islands (British Virgin Islands: Methodist Church, 1989, 151 pp)
Blackman, Francis, Methodism, 200 years in Barbados (Barbados: Caribbean Contact, 1988, 160 pp)

See also

 History of the Caribbean
 Caribbean literature
 Caribbean poetry

Citations
Lambert, D., White Creole culture, politics and identity during the age of abolition (2005)
Donnelly, D., Retrieving charisms for the twenty-first century (1999), p. 114
Byfield, J., Gendering the African Diaspora: Women, Culture, and Historical (2010), p. 185
Oduyoye M. A., Introducing African women's theology (2001), p. 113
Brathwaite, J. A., Women and the law: a bibliographical survey of legal and... (1999), p. 178
O'Neal, E., From the field to the legislature: a history of women in the ... (2001), p. 61
Barriteau, E., Stronger, surer, bolder: Ruth Nita Barrow: social change and ... (2001), p. 214
Greenidge, M., Holetown, Barbados: settlement revisited and other accounts (2004)

References

Barbadian male writers
Barbadian Methodists
1922 births
2010 deaths
People from Saint Michael, Barbados
Barbadian expatriates in Saint Kitts and Nevis